Luke Mitchell is an Australian actor.  

Luke Mitchell may also refer to:
Luke Mitchell (footballer) (born 1992), Australian rules footballer
Luke Mitchell (soccer) (born 2001), American soccer player
Luke Mitchell, convicted murderer of Jodi Jones